Please see "major" for other countries which use this rank
Major is a rank of the Canadian Armed Forces.  The rank insignia of a major in the Royal Canadian Air Force is two half-inch stripes with a quarter-inch stripe between. The rank insignia in the Canadian Army is a crown.  Majors fill the positions of company/squadron/battery commanders, or deputy commanders of a battalion/regiment; in the Air Force they are typically squadron second-in-command, or commander of a detached helicopter flight embarked onboard Canadian naval vessels. The naval equivalent rank for major is lieutenant-commander.

Military ranks of Canada